Chinese Parents (Chinese: 中国式家长; pinyin: Zhōngguó Shì Jiāzhǎng) is a child-raising life simulation game by Beijing-based studio Moyuwan Games. It was published by Coconut Island Games in September 2018 for Microsoft Windows August 2020 for the Nintendo Switch and May 2022 for mobile devices. The game was a bestseller on Steam and a success for the Chinese indie game scene.

References

Further reading

External links 
 
 

2018 video games
Life simulation games
Video games developed in China
Indie video games
Single-player video games
MacOS games
Nintendo Switch games
Windows games